Lolak is a Philippine language spoken in Lolak town, Bolaang Mongondow Regency, North Sulawesi (Celebes), Indonesia. There are fewer than 50 speakers.

Citations

References

 

Gorontalo–Mongondow languages
Languages of Sulawesi